Charles Perrot, (16 February 192911 November 2013) was a French Roman Catholic priest and biblical scholar, He served as honorary professor of New Testament at the Catholic Institute of Paris. A specialist in contemporary Judaism of Jesus, Perrot has been known for his studies of the historical Jesus and the New Testament.

Education 
In 1957, he got his PhD with the entitled thesis L'Arrière-plan de la narration synoptique hormis les récits de la Passion et de la Résurrection. Quelques hypothèses de critique littéraire.

Career 
In 1953 he was ordained priest in the Diocese of Moulins in Allier, where he served as such and then retired with the function of dean of the cathedral.

Perrot collaborated in the Association catholique française pour l'étude de la Bible. Congrès (1979 Paris, France) Etudes sur la première lettre de Pierre.

C. Perrot is the author of Jésus et l'histoire (Desclée de Brouwer, 1993) which has become a reference book on the historical background of Jesus and the early Judeo-Christians.

In 2005 he became honorary Professor of Exegesis of the New Testament at the Catholic Institute of Paris. There he was one of the biblical scholars with Henri Cazelles, Pierre Grelot, Antoine Vanel, and Jacques Briend. He was a Catholic theologian, having taught for a third of a century at the Catholic Faculties of Lyon (1960–1974) and at the Catholic Institute of Paris (1970–1994).

Notable works

References

Sources 

2013 deaths
1929 births
Academic staff of the Institut Catholique de Paris
20th-century French Catholic theologians
French Roman Catholic priests